Jérôme Cohen-Olivar (born 1964) is a Moroccan-French film director, best known for Kandisha (2008), a fantasy film inspired by the myth of Aicha Kandicha.

Life
Cohen-Olivar mostly grew up in Morocco, where he made movies on super 8mm film, before moving to Los Angeles. Susan Susan, his first short film, was a satire about secret immigration to the United States, bought by Disney for about $300,000.

The Midnight Orchestra, a comedy based around the story of a man travelling to Morocco to revive his father's orchestra, examined the experiences of Jews leaving Morocco. It won the Prize of the Ecumenical Jury at Montreal World Film Festival in 2015.

Works
 Susan Susan, 1987 (short)
 Cool Crime, 1999
 Kandisha, 2008
 The Midnight Orchestra (L'orchestre de minuit), 2015
 The 16th Episode / Little Horror Movie, 2018

References

External links
 Jerome Cohen-Olivar Discusses ‘Little Horror Movie’, Horror News Network, 5 November 2018.

1964 births
Living people
Moroccan film directors
French film directors